"Lucy" is the name George Harrison of the Beatles gave to the unique red Gibson Les Paul guitar he received from Eric Clapton in August 1968. Previously owned by rock guitarists John Sebastian and Rick Derringer, Lucy is one of the most famous electric guitars in the world.

Origins
Lucy was originally a "Goldtop" Les Paul Standard model with PAF humbucking pickups, a combination initially produced only in 1957 and part of 1958. Gibson records show that serial number 7-8789 was shipped from the Kalamazoo factory on December 19, 1957. By 1965 the guitar was owned by John Sebastian of The Lovin' Spoonful, who traded it to Rick Derringer of tourmates The McCoys for an amplifier to replace one which had blown.

At one point circa 1966 the guitar's original gold finish was worn and, according to Derringer, "It was a very, very used guitar, even when I got it... so I figured that since we didn’t live far from Gibson’s factory in Kalamazoo, the next time the group went there I’d give it to Gibson and have it refinished. I had it done at the factory in the SG-style clear red finish that was popular at the time." However, Derringer wasn't happy with the guitar after the refinish; he sold it to Dan Armstrong's guitar shop in New York.

Clapton and Harrison
The guitar had only been in Armstrong's shop for a few days when it was purchased by Eric Clapton. Clapton did not play this instrument much, his principal guitars in 1966–1968 being his psychedelic 1964 SG called "The Fool", a 1964 ES-335, a 1963 or 64 Reverse Firebird, and a sunburst 1960 Les Paul he bought from Andy Summers. In August 1968 Clapton gave the red Les Paul as a present to his good friend George Harrison. Harrison dubbed the guitar "Lucy", after redhead comedian Lucille Ball.

Harrison and the Beatles were at the time recording their self-titled double album (also known as "the White Album"), and had been working for several weeks on "While My Guitar Gently Weeps". Harrison had been unable to record a lead guitar part that he was satisfied with; moreover, Lennon and McCartney were dismissive of the song and "didn't try very hard". Knowing that his bandmates would be on good behaviour around a guest musician, Harrison invited Clapton to come into EMI Studios on September 6 and play on the song, telling him "you don't need to bring a guitar, you know I've got a good Les Paul you can use." Clapton overdubbed the part in a single take. The story that Clapton ceremoniously presented Harrison with the guitar after this session is a widely repeated myth.

Harrison continued to play Lucy as one of his principal guitars for the remainder of his time with the Beatles. It can be seen in the promotional videos for "Revolution" and “The Ballad of John and Yoko”, and the 1970 Let It Be documentary film. Lucy can be heard during the three-way guitar solo near the end of "The End".

Theft and recovery

In 1973 Lucy was one of the items stolen in a burglary at Harrison's home in Beverly Hills.  The thief or an intermediary sold it at Whalin's Sound City on Sunset Boulevard in Hollywood; owner George Whalin promptly resold it (in violation of the statutory 30-day waiting period) to Miguel Ochoa, a musician from Guadalajara, Mexico. When the red guitar appeared on a police stolen-property bulletin Whalin called Ochoa's contact number, his friend Mark Havey; this began a lengthy negotiation which resulted, ultimately, in Harrison via Havey trading Ochoa a sunburst Les Paul and a Fender Precision Bass for the return of Lucy. Harrison later referred to the incident as a "kidnapping"; he kept Lucy until his death in 2001. In 2014, the History Channel show Brad Meltzer's Lost History featured this story.

See also
 List of guitars

Notes

References

Individual guitars
George Harrison
Eric Clapton's musical instruments
Instruments of musicians
1957 in music
Gibson Les Paul